The Canonflex is a Canon 35 mm film single-lens reflex (SLR) camera introduced in May 1959. Its standard lens is the Canon Camera Co. Super-Canomatic R 50mm lens 1.8. The camera was in production for one year before it was replaced by the Canonflex R2000, adding a 1/2000 sec. shutter speed.

History 
By the 1950s, the Japanese camera industry had turned their interest towards the 35 mm SLR camera, which to that point had been exclusively manufactured in Europe, and in particular in Dresden, Germany. The first Japanese 35 mm SLR camera was Asahiflex. It was soon followed by several manufacturers. The Miranda T was launched in 1955. In 1958 Minolta and Topcon followed, while Nikon presented their Nikon F in 1959, by that time a supplier of rangefinder cameras based on the Contax concept. Canon had established itself as a 35 mm rangefinder camera manufacturer, featuring a wide variety of camera models and lenses using the Leica 39mm standard lens mount.

The first Canon SLR camera 
The Canonflex was introduced in May, 1959 by Canon of Tokyo, Japan. It is Canon's first 35 mm single-lens reflex camera. Its standard lens is the Super-Canomatic R 50mm 1.8, using the first version of Canon's breech-lock manual-focus lens mount, the R lens mount, which would evolve into the Canon FL and Canon FD lens mounts over the next three decades. The Super-Canomatic lens features fully automatic aperture operation, using two internal connections.  Canomatic and R-series lenses use semi-automatic or manual diaphragms.  Though the breech-lock mount itself remained unchanged until the introduction of the EF lenses for EOS autofocus cameras in the late 1980s, the actuating levers of the Canomatic or R-series lenses operate differently from their FL and FD descendants.

The Canonflex RP was inspired to an extent by the company's rangefinder camera models. It has a wind-on lever on the camera's base operated by the left middle finger. This aided rapid shutter release but hindered tripod mounting and rendered the leather case unwieldy. At the right-hand camera front is a wide accessory shoe taking a selenium exposure meter, which couples to the shutter speed dial. The camera stayed in production for one year before it was replaced by the Canonflex R2000, adding the 1/2000 sec. shutter speed and the thumb operated wind on operation.

References

External links 
 Canon Inc. Flex. Canon Camera Museum, retrieved November 13, 2018.
 Canon Inc. Canon Camera Story: 1955-1969. Canon's online Camera Museum, retrieved November 18, 2005.
 Gandy, Stephen (2003) Canon's 1st SLR: the 1959 Canonflex. Cameraquest.com, retrieved November 18, 2005.

135 film cameras
Canon R cameras
Products introduced in 1959